Setebos may refer to:

Setebos (Shakespeare), the deity purportedly worshipped by the witch Sycorax in William Shakespeare's play The Tempest
Caliban upon Setebos, an 1864 Robert Browning poem describing the musings of Sycorax's son, Caliban, on the god
Setebos (moon), a moon of the planet Uranus, named for the deity in The Tempest
Setibos, an impact crater on Umbriel, a moon of the planet Uranus, named for the deity in The Tempest
Megaleledone setebos, an octopus of family Octopodidae